Nyikang is a semi-legendary founder of the Shilluk Kingdom, in the 16th century. He is a notion by which the Shilluk people apprehend a unity and coherence in the specifically Shilluk world.

References 

Mythological kings
African kings